Charles X (1757–1836) was King of France.

Charles X may also refer to:

 Charles X Gustav of Sweden (1622–1660), King of Sweden
 Charles, Cardinal de Bourbon (1523–1590), recognized as Charles X of France but renounced the royal title

See also
 
 King Charles (disambiguation)
 Professor X, Charles Francis Xavier, a fictional character in X-Men comics and movies
 "Charlie X", an episode of the TV show Star Trek